Gabriel Signoret (November 15, 1878 – March 16, 1937, in Paris, France) was a French silent film actor.

He starred in some 70 films between 1910 and 1938.

In 1920 he appeared in Guy du Fresnay's Flipotte.

His brother Jean Signoret (born 1886) was also an actor.

See also 
 Infatuation (1918)
 Roger la Honte (1922)
 The Secret of Polichinelle (1923)
 The Bread Peddler (1923)
 The Two Boys (1924)
 Jocaste (1925)
 Veille d'armes (1935)
 27 Rue de la Paix (1936)
 The New Men (1936)
 Let's Make a Dream (1936)
 The Flame (1936)
 Ménilmontant (1936)
 Nuits de feu (1937)
 Arsene Lupin, Detective (1937)
 Culprit (1937)

External links 

1878 births
1937 deaths
French male film actors
French male silent film actors
20th-century French male actors